This is a list of the number-one songs of 2018 in Mexico. The airplay chart rankings are published by Monitor Latino, based on airplay across radio stations in Mexico using the Radio Tracking Data, LLC in real time. Charts are compiled from Monday to Sunday.

The streaming charts are published by AMPROFON (Asociación Mexicana de Productores de Fonogramas y Videogramas).

Chart history (Airplay)
Besides the General chart, Monitor Latino publishes "Pop", "Popular" (Regional Mexican music) and "Anglo" charts. Monitor Latino provided two lists for each of these charts: the "Audience" list ranked the songs according to the estimated number of people that listened to them on the radio during the week.
The "Tocadas" (Spins) list ranked the songs according to the number of times they were played on the radio during the week.

General

"Tu postura" by Banda MS was the best performing song of the year, both by estimated audience and number of spins.

Pop
This chart ranks Spanish-language songs from all genres, except for Regional Mexican music (which is listed under the "Popular" chart).

Popular

This chart ranks songs that fall under the Regional Mexican category.

Anglo
This chart ranks English-language songs from all genres.

Chart history (Streaming)

See also
List of number-one albums of 2018 (Mexico)

References

2018
Number-one songs
Mexico